The shipwreck site of the motor launch Forward is located in Lake George, New York approximately three and one half miles north of the village of Lake George.  The motor launch was built in 1906 by Gas Engine & Power Co. and Charles L. Seabury & Co., Consolidated (Morris Heights, New York City, New York).  It was one of the first gasoline-powered vessels on Lake George.  The original owner was William K. Bixby.

It is the 21st property listed as a featured property of the week in a program of the National Park Service that began in July, 2008.

References

Shipwrecks on the National Register of Historic Places in New York (state)
Archaeological sites on the National Register of Historic Places in New York (state)
Buildings and structures in Warren County, New York
Shipwrecks of New York (state)
Shipwrecks in lakes
1906 ships
National Register of Historic Places in Warren County, New York
Ships built in Morris Heights, Bronx